Label 228 is a type of sticker issued by the United States Postal Service, made to be used for labeling packages with a mailing address. These stickers are given out by the postal service free, either by mail  or at the post office.

Because of the label's availability, and the relatively large blank areas within the design, it has been widely used in sticker art and graffiti more commonly known as "slaps".  Unlike many other stickers and labels, label 228 is free, and can be acquired in large quantities (up to 750 at a time through the USPS website).  It can be drawn on using many different artistic media, including acrylic paints and simple pencils, as well as inkjet and laser printers.  They can also be applied to many surfaces very quickly, reducing the risk of being caught.

See also 
United States Postal Service
Culture jamming
Sticker art
Graffiti

References

Visual arts media
Graffiti and unauthorised signage
Stickers
United States Postal Service